Hussain Eslami (born 22 May 1969) is an Iranian former cyclist. He competed in two events at the 1992 Summer Olympics.

References

External links
 

1969 births
Living people
Iranian male cyclists
Olympic cyclists of Iran
Cyclists at the 1992 Summer Olympics
Place of birth missing (living people)
20th-century Iranian people